The VCU Rams women's basketball team is the intercollegiate women's basketball program that represents Virginia Commonwealth University. The Rams play in the Atlantic 10 Conference.

History
VCU began play in 1974. They have made the NCAA Tournament twice (2009 and 2021), while making the WNIT six times (2008, 2010, 2011, 2012, 2014, and 2019). They joined the CAA in 1995, playing until 2012, when they joined the Atlantic 10 Conference.

NCAA tournament results
The Rams have made the NCAA Division I women's basketball tournament two times, and have an overall record of 0–2.

References

External links
 

 
1974 establishments in Virginia
Basketball teams established in 1974